XRY may refer to:

 Jerez Airport in Jerez de la Frontera, Spain.
 XRY (software) a forensic software which examines mobile devices
 Extinction Rebellion Youth, an environmental advocacy youth group